The Lancashire Parish Register Society is a text publication society and registered charity which was founded for the "purpose of printing the registers of the ancient parishes" in Lancashire and has published more than 175 volumes, CDs and CD-Roms since 1898.

History
The society was formed at a meeting at Chetham's Library, convened by the historian Henry Fishwick, on 26 November 1897, but the year 1898 was fixed as the first year of the society's existence. The society became a registered charity (No. 511396) in 1981.

Publications
Since 1898, the society has published 175 printed volumes of Lancashire's parish registers, as well as numerous CDs and CD-Roms. The society published its 175th volume in 2012.

Membership
Membership is open to all individuals and institutions interested in the parish registers of the county.

Officers

Presidents

General Editors

Secretaries

Treasurers

See also 
 Chetham Society
 Historic Society of Lancashire and Cheshire
 Record Society of Lancashire and Cheshire
 Lancashire and Cheshire Antiquarian Society

References

External links 
 Lancashire Parish Register Society 2017-01-26. Retrieved 2017-01-26.

Historical societies of the United Kingdom
Text publication societies